Yamansu (Laqa-Otar) is a rural locality (a selo) in Novolaksky District, Republic of Dagestan, Russia. The population was 781 as of 2010. There are 15 streets.

Geography 
Yamansu is located 21 km southwest of Khasavyurt and 7 km northwest of Novolakskoye (the district's administrative centre) by road, on the Yamansu River. Banayurt and Balansu are the nearest rural localities.

Nationalities 
Chechens live there.

References 

Rural localities in Novolaksky District